Ileodictyon cibarium is a saprotrophic species of fungus in the family Phallaceae. It is native to Australia and New Zealand, where it is commonly known as the basket fungus or the white basket fungus, alluding to its fruit bodies, shaped like a round or oval ball with interlaced or latticed branches, resembling polyhedra similar to closed fullerenes. Although the immature spherical fruitbodies are reportedly edible, the mature fruit body is foul-smelling and partly covered with a slime layer containing spores (gleba) on the inner surfaces.

Taxonomy and etymology 
Ileodictyon cibarium was originally described by Edmond Tulasne and Charles Tulasne in a paper by Étienne Raoul in 1844. The type specimen was collected in New Zealand.

The Māori people had 35 different names referring to I. cibarium. These included tutae kehua ("ghost droppings"), tūtae whatitiri, and whareatua ("house of the devil"), kōkirikiriwhetū, kōpurawhetū, korokorowhetū, wheterau, popowhaitiri, tikowhatitiri, paruwhatitiri, matakupenga, and tūtae whetū. Several of the names refer to Whaitiri, the atua and personification of thunder, this is because of the frequent appearance of I. cibarium fruit bodies following thunderstorms.

In a 2018 poll, I. cibarium was ranked second by Manaaki Whenua – Landcare Research for its pick as New Zealand's national fungus, being defeated by Entoloma hochstetteri.

Description 

Prior to the opening of the outer skin, the fruit body is egg-shaped and white to greyish. After opening, it is a whitish mesh-like ball measuring up to 25 cm in diameter. The different growth stages of L. cibarium were illustrated by John Buchanan.

Ileodictyon cibarium is similar to and sometimes confused with Ileodictyon gracile (smooth cage fungus), which is also native to Australia. The two species are both whitish, mesh balls of similar size, but can be differentiated by characteristics of the receptacle arms that form the mesh. I. cibarium has a thicker mesh with arms that are wrinkled, about 5 times wider, elliptical in cross section, and not thickened where the arms meet, compared to I. gracile.

Distribution and Habitat
Ileodictyon cibarium is native to New Zealand and Australia and has also been found in Chile and Brazil as well as in Africa, probably as a result of it being introduced. It is also known from several sites in England, where it is certainly introduced. It grows alone or clustered together near woody debris, in lawns, gardens, and cultivated soil, along roads, in forest.

Edibility
The immature fruitbodies are edible.

References

External links
Ileodictyon cibarium in the NZFUNGI database
Mushroom Expert
Ileodictyon cibarium occurrence data from Australasian Virtual Herbarium
Ileodictyon cibarium discussed in RNZ Critter of the Week, 19 August 2022

Phallales
Fungi described in 1844
Fungi of New Zealand
Fungi of Australia
Taxa named by Edmond Tulasne
Taxa named by Charles Tulasne